Local elections were held on 12 March 2017 in Nikšić, on 7 May in Herceg Novi and on 26 November in the municipalities of Cetinje, Mojkovac and Petnjica, as well as Tuzi, which is set to become a municipality in 2018.

Results

March election

Nikšić

Local election for Nikšić Municipality was held on 12 March 2017. It was boycotted by all the opposition parties after the Government announced the imprisonment of the leaders of the opposition coalition Democratic Front. Only the ruling DPS and its minor partner SD ran in the election, with voter turnout at 45%, while 11% of the votes cast were spoilt.

Turnout: 45.00%

Elected mayor: Veselin Grbović (DPS)

May elections

Herceg Novi

Turnout: 67.02%

Elected mayor: Stevan Katić (Democrats)

November elections

Cetinje

Turnout: 70.9%

Elected mayor: Aleksandar Kašćelan (DPS)

Mojkovac

Turnout: 83.5%

Elected mayor: Ranko Mišnić (DPS)

Petnjica

Turnout: 48.66%

Elected mayor: Samir Agović (DPS)

Tuzi, Podgorica

Turnout: 60.7%

Elected mayor: Nik Gjeloshaj (AA)

References

Local elections in Montenegro
2017 elections in Europe
2017 in Montenegro
March 2017 events in Europe
May 2017 events in Europe
November 2017 events in Europe